Leucoptera coronillae is a moth in the family Lyonetiidae. It is found in southern France, Spain, Sardinia and mainland Italy.

The larvae feed on Cytisus sessilifolius and Cytisus villosus. They mine the leaves of their host plant. The mine starts as a violet spot somewhere in the centre of the leaf. Around this point a blotch mine develops with much frass in concentric arcs. Pupation takes place outside of the mine.

References

Leucoptera (moth)
Moths described in 1933
Moths of Europe